David Cripps is a British active horn-player and conductor. He was principal horn in the London Symphony Orchestra during the years that they played Star Wars and Superman. He has also performed with the BBC National Orchestra of Wales, the Hallé Orchestra, and the Philharmonia Orchestra. He is a former professor of horn at Florida State University, Northern Arizona University, the Eastman School of Music, the Royal Northern College of Music, and the Guildhall School of Music and Drama. He was the director of Orchestra Northern Arizona from 2008-2018, and he is also the Music Director and Conductor of the Verde Valley Sinfonietta.

External links
Bio of David Cripps

Horn players
Florida State University faculty
London Symphony Orchestra players
Living people
American male conductors (music)
21st-century American conductors (music)
Year of birth missing (living people)